Orange Center Historic District may refer to:

in the United States
Orange Center Historic District (Orange, Connecticut), listed on the NRHP in Connecticut
Orange Center Historic District (Orange, Massachusetts), listed on the NRHP in Massachusetts